Nick Emmanwori is an American football cornerback for the South Carolina Gamecocks.

High School career 
Emmanwori attended Irmo High School in Irmo, South Carolina. A 3 star recruit ranked the sixth best prospect in South Carolina, he committed to play college football at the University of South Carolina.

College career 
Entering his freshman season South Carolina debated playing Emmanwori as a linebacker or cornerback, ultimately deciding to play him at corner. In his first two collegiate starts, Emmanwori would record 11 and 14 tackles against Arkansas and Georgia respectively. As a true freshman in 2022 Emmanwori would emerge as an unexpected star for the Gamecocks, recording a team high 78 tackles and being named to the SEC All-Freshman Team.

References

External links 
 South Carolina Gamecocks bio

Living people
2004 births
American football cornerbacks
South Carolina Gamecocks football players
Players of American football from South Carolina
People from Irmo, South Carolina